Sokół Ostróda is a Polish football club based in Ostróda, Warmian-Masurian Voivodeship. They compete in the fourth-tier III liga.

References

External links
  
 Sokół at 90minut.pl 

Ostróda County
Football clubs in Poland
Football clubs in Warmian-Masurian Voivodeship